Kallumala is a village near Mavelikara railway station in Mavelikara taluk. Kallumala is the twenty-first ward of Thazhakkara Grama Panchayat, Alappuzha district in the Indian state of Kerala.

Education 

CMS LP School established in 1856 was the first school in Kallumala. In 1964 Bishop Moore College was established at Kallumala.

Geography

Mavelikara is a region of sandy mud, while Kallumala is a hill with laterite soil. Kallumala consist of two squares, the college square (Vadakkemukku) and the Thekkemukku square, which are connected with two roads.

Religious places
Kallumala Siva Temple
Akkanattukara Siva temple
St. Pauls CSI Church
St. Gregorios Orthodox church
St. Mary's Malankara Syrian Catholic Church (Bethany Church)

Infrastructure
Indian Overseas Bank (with ATM)
Catholic Syrian Bank
Federal Bank (ATM only)
SBI (ATM only)
Kallumala agricultural co-operative bank
Post office

Educational institutions
Bishop Moore college aided
CMS LP school
Mar Ivanios College (unaided)
Bishop Moore Vidyapith (unaided)
St Mary's Cathedral Public School Mavelikara (unaided)

Healthcare
 Ashwini Ayurvedasram
 P M Varghese Memorial Hospital
 PuthiyaDam Hospital

Other establishments include Kiran studio, Jemini studio, Mambally medicals, Illikkal medicals, Panackal stores and Nadavallil store, along with many grocery shops. A ration shop is located near to the junction.

Notable people
 P. C. Alexander secretary to Indira Gandhi
 Valson Thampu Delhi University
 Chitramezhuthu K. M. Varghese
 K. K. Sudhakaran (novelist)

References 

Villages in Alappuzha district